was a town located in Higashiibaraki District, Ibaraki Prefecture, Japan.

As of 2003, the town had an estimated population of 19,545 and a density of 310.34 persons per km². The total area was 62.98 km².

On March 27, 2006, Ogawa, along with the town of Minori (also from Higashiibaraki District), and the village of Tamari (from Niihari District), was merged to create the city of Omitama.

External links
Omitama official website 

Dissolved municipalities of Ibaraki Prefecture